Miguel Américo Belloto Gutiérrez (born 11 December 1964), known professionally as Miguel Varoni, is a Colombian-Argentinian host, actor and director. He is married to Colombian actress Catherine Siachoque.
He is the son of the actress Teresa Gutiérrez.

Filmography

Film

Television

References

External links

Male actors from Buenos Aires
Argentine people of Italian descent
Argentine people of Colombian descent
Colombian people of Italian descent
Colombian people of Argentine descent
Colombian male telenovela actors
Colombian male television actors
1964 births
Living people